Carrai is a monotypic genus of Australian spiders in the family Euagridae. It contains the single species, Carrai afoveolata. It was first described by Robert Raven in 1984, and has only been found in Australia.

References

Euagridae
Monotypic Mygalomorphae genera